is a centaur and Uranus co-orbital, approximately  in diameter, first observed on December 26, 2014, by the Pan-STARRS survey.

Description 
Centaur  is a temporary  trojan of Uranus, the second one ( was identified first) to be confirmed as currently trapped in such a resonant state. This object may have remained as a  Uranian Trojan for about 60,000 years and it can continue that way for another 80,000 years. Numerical integrations suggest that it may stay within Uranus' co-orbital zone for nearly one million years.

Besides being a  Uranian trojan,  is trapped in the 7:20 mean motion resonance with Saturn as well; therefore, this minor body is currently subjected to a three-body resonance. The other known Uranian trojan, is also in this resonant configuration.

See also 
 
 83982 Crantor

References

External links 
 Far-off asteroid caught cohabiting with Uranus around the sun
 

Trojan minor planets
Uranus co-orbital minor planets

Minor planet object articles (unnumbered)
20141226